Bulbophyllum menghaiense is a species of orchid in the genus Bulbophyllum. This species is native to South-Central China.

References
The Bulbophyllum-Checklist
The Internet Orchid Species Photo Encyclopedia
http://powo.science.kew.org/taxon/urn:lsid:ipni.org:names:897121-1 

menghaiense